Sandbeck is a surname. Notable people with the surname include:

Vidar Sandbeck (1918–2005), Norwegian folk singer, composer, and writer
Cal Sandbeck (born 1956), American professional ice hockey player

See also
Sandbeck Park, 17th-century country house in South Yorkshire, England